Francoise Boufhal (born 18 December 1988) is an English model, actress and presenter.

Early life

Born Françoise Boufhal on 18 December 1988 in Hexham, Northumberland, England, Boufhal grew up and spent most of her childhood in Stocksfield and attended Broomley First school before moving into Newcastle Upon Tyne. She attended Ponteland Middle school.

Acting

Boufhal's acting career began at the age of 11 when she joined The Live Theatre Company, a theatrical youth theatre based in Newcastle made famous by Robson Green. Boufhal's first major role was in the hit children's BBC 1 show Byker Grove, where she played Ellie Baines, Stumpy's girlfriend. Boufhal auditioned several times for a role in the show but was deemed 'too sexy', until eventually a part was made for the curvaceous actress. She grew into her body very fast. At the age of 16 she became 'very curvy' and her chest size had increased rapidly. (At the age of 11, she was 28B. By the age of 14, 28D. By 16 she was her full size.) She had a slim figure but was not generally considered tall, which presented difficulty in her modelling and acting career. Boufhal was, however, in the pilot for GRUBBS, a children's cookery program scheduled to be regularly on the Discovery Kids channel.

Modelling

At , and having a 28H chest, Boufhal was rejected by fashion houses for being too small and having an 'unusual' figure'.

Boufhal has appeared in Nuts as "Nuts Next Top Model", Zoo, and was Maxim's April 2009 cover girl.

FHM claimed Boufhal was "one to watch" of 2011, by popular demand was featured on the cover followed up with a spread.

Boufhal is featured in a non-pictorial article in the June 2010 issue of Playboy United States.

Presenting

In April 2009, Rio Ferdinand signed Boufhal up to his digital magazine #5 as his co-presenter.

In May 2010 she made her debut on MTV interviewing celebrities and super car collectors for the London Motor Museum.

Boufhal is currently the weekly "Bloke Counsellor" for Maxim UK, involving a heavy online presence.

References

1988 births
Living people
English stage actresses
English female models